HMS Moorsom was an  which served in the Royal Navy during the First World War. The M class were an improvement on the preceding , capable of higher speed. Moorsom, the first ship to enter navy service to be named after Admiral Sir Robert Moorsom, was launched in December 1914, initially serving as part of the Grand Fleet before being transferred to the Harwich Force the following year. Briefly rejoining the Grand Fleet, the destroyer saw service in the Battle of Jutland in 1916 supporting the British battlecruisers and received hits from a battleship of the German High Seas Fleet. Moorsom also undertook other duties, including escorting the troop ship  in June 1915 and the minelayer  in August 1915 and November 1916. After the Armistice, the destroyer was placed in reserve and subsequently sold to be broken up in November 1921.

Design and development
Moorsom was one of the initial six s ordered by the British Admiralty in May 1913 as part of the 1913–14 Naval Programme, one of the last destroyers to be ordered before the outbreak of the First World War. The M-class was an improved version of the earlier  destroyers, designed to reach a higher speed in order to counter rumoured German fast destroyers, although it transpired these vessels did not exist.

Displacement was  normal and  full load.

Armament consisted of three single QF  Mk IV guns on the ship's centreline, with one on the forecastle, one aft on a raised platform and one between the middle and aft funnels. A single 2-pounder  "pom-pom" anti-aircraft gun was carried, while torpedo armament consisted of two twin mounts for  torpedoes. The ship had a complement of 76 officers and ratings.

Construction and career
Moorsom was laid down by John Brown & Company of Clydebank on 27 February 1914 with the yard number 427, was launched on 20 December, started trials on 1 February in the Firth of Clyde the following year and was completed on 17 March. The vessel was the first to be named after the naval officer Admiral Sir Robert Moorsom. Moorsom  was deployed as part of the Grand Fleet, joining the newly formed Tenth Destroyer Flotilla.

The destroyer took part in a wide range of activities during the war, usually alongside other members of the flotilla. For example, the flotilla was involved in escorting ships in 1915. Moorsom was chosen to accompany  on 9 and 10 June as the troop ship sailed to join the Gallipoli campaign. On 16 August, the ship formed part of a flotilla of eight destroyers that escorted the minelayer  on a sortie from Sheerness. One of their number, was torpedoed by the torpedo boats of the German Second Flotilla, but the crew of Moorsom thought the explosion meant that they had entered a minefield and, taking refuge behind the minelayer, escaped without harm. By October, the destroyer, along with the rest of the flotilla, had been transferred to the Harwich Force.

At the Battle of Jutland on 31 May 1916, Moorsom was attached to the Thirteenth Destroyer Flotilla under the light cruiser . Disengaging, the destroyer sighted the departing vessels of the High Seas Fleet and launched four torpedoes, none of which hit. Moorsom did not return to the battle and instead was forced to return to port with damaged oil tanks. It is likely the tanks were hit by  shells from the battleship . By the following day, the ship had returned to the Tenth Flotilla, now based in Dover.

Moorsom was one of eight destroyers of the Tenth Flotilla sent with the destroyer leader  to Dunkirk on 19 January 1917 to provide reinforcement to the Dover Patrol in the event of German torpedo attacks on the Dover Barrage and shipping in the English Channel. On 22 January, an intercepted German radio signal warned the British Admiralty that the German Sixth Torpedo Boat Flotilla was to be sent from the High Seas Fleet to reinforce their forces at Flanders. The warship was then given a refit, returning to Dover on 28 February. Moorsom rejoined the Dover Patrol, which now included thirteen monitors, forming part of the Sixth Destroyer Flotilla. The operation was deemed a success as the Admiralty gained intelligence that the bombardment led to the German command doubting that Ostend was a safe haven for their warships. Moorsom formed part of the support for a similar bombardment on 5 June by Erebus and Terror.

The destroyer accompanied a subsequent attack on Zeebrugge by monitors on 23 April 1918, which also included the sinking of blockships to impede the flow of German submarines leaving the port. The ship provided a similar service to the monitors that attacked Ostend on 9 May, which again included Erebus, Sir John Moore and Terror. Although this operation did not meet the expectations of the Admiralty and the port remained open, the bombardment was achieved without interference by enemy warships or the loss of any British vessel.

After the Armistice of 11 November 1918 that ended the war, the Royal Navy returned to a peacetime level of strength and both the number of ships and the amount of personnel needed to be reduced to save money. Moorsom was declared superfluous to operational requirements. On 15 October 1919, the destroyer was given a reduced complement and placed in reserve at Devonport. However, this did not last long and, on 8 November 1921, Moorsom was sold to Slough TC to be broken up in Germany.

Pennant numbers

References

Citations

Bibliography

  
 
 
 
 
 
 
 

 
 
 
 
 
 
 
 
 
 
 

1914 ships
Admiralty M-class destroyers
Ships built on the River Clyde
World War I destroyers of the United Kingdom